was a Japanese professional baseball second baseman. He played in Nippon Professional Baseball (NPB) for the Osaka/Hanshin Tigers (1957–1966; 1970–1972) and Kintetsu Buffaloes (1967–1969).

Kamata was known for defense, and was particularly adept at jump throws and backhand tosses, the latter of which was rare in Nippon Professional Baseball. In retirement, Kamata became a youth baseball coach, benefactor, and baseball commentator. Kamata was diagnosed with lung cancer in May 2019, hospitalized for treatment in July, and died of the disease in an Ashiya, Hyōgo hospital on 1 August 2019.

References

External links

1939 births
2019 deaths
Hanshin Tigers players
Kintetsu Buffaloes players
Nippon Professional Baseball second basemen
Sportspeople from Hyōgo Prefecture
Deaths from lung cancer in Japan